Jean-Sébastien Bax (born October 5, 1972 in Marseille, France) is a retired French-Mauritian footballer.

He played mainly as a defensive midfielder and a defender. Over the years, he played for Fire Brigade SC in Mauritius, AS Marsouins in Réunion, and Engen Santos in South Africa. He also represented Mauritius in international play, making 36 appearances and scoring 5 goals.

References

External links

Living people
1972 births
Footballers from Marseille
French people of Mauritian descent
French footballers
Mauritian footballers
Mauritius international footballers
Mauritian expatriate footballers
Expatriate footballers in Réunion
Expatriate soccer players in South Africa
Mauritian expatriate sportspeople in Réunion
Mauritian expatriate sportspeople in South Africa
Association football midfielders
Association football defenders
Association football utility players
Santos F.C. (South Africa) players